Matthew C. Weinzierl is an American academic. He is a Professor of Business Administration at the Harvard Business School. He has published research on taxation. He worked at McKinsey & Company after he attended Harvard University.

Education
Weinzierl earned a PhD in economics from Harvard University in 2008.

Career
Weinzierl worked as an economist for McKinsey & Company and the Council of Economic Advisers. He later joined the Harvard Business School as a professor of Business Administration. He is also a research associate at the National Bureau of Economic Research.

Weinzierl has published research on taxation. He believes the United States should have a value-added tax. With Alexander Gelber, an associate professor at the University of California, Berkeley's Goldman School of Public Policy, Weinzierl won the Richard Musgrave Prize from the National Tax Association in 2016.

Personal life
Matthew Weinzierl is married to Coventry Edwards-Pitt. They live in Massachusetts.

References

Living people
Harvard Graduate School of Arts and Sciences alumni
McKinsey & Company people
United States Council of Economic Advisers
Harvard Business School faculty
21st-century American economists
Year of birth missing (living people)